Fight For Freedom (FFF) was a gang that was centered in the San Fernando Valley during the 1980s.  Unique to this gang in its locale and time was that the group generally consisted of White Americans from middle class and upper middle class backgrounds.  The gang was founded by members of a punk rock band of the same name.

FFF's activities largely came to an end when one of its prominent members, 15-year-old Mark Miller, was fatally shot outside of a Van Nuys nightclub in 1985.

References

Further reading

Historical gangs of Los Angeles
Punk gangs
Peckerwood